Arnold Stadler (born 1954) is a German writer, essayist and translator.

Life 

He was born on 9 April 1954 in Meßkirch in the district of Sigmaringen in Baden-Württemberg in Germany. Stadler grew up on a farm in Rast, a small village adjoining Sauldorf, a neighboring village of his birthplace Meßkirch. Stadler studied catholic theology in Munich and Rome, German philology at Freiburg im Breisgau and Köln, ending with a doctoral degree (Dr. phil.). The first serious and prominent recommendation regarding his works came 1994 of Martin Walser (Der Spiegel No. 31 from 1 August 1994). The partial autobiographically affected works play frequently in his region of origin (Heimat), the landscape between the Danube and the Lake of Constance. The change of this rurally shaped area and its homelessness (Heimatlosigkeit) are recurring topics in his literary works.

Literature awards and distinctions 

1989 Literature Award (Literaturförderpreis) of the Jürgen Ponto Stiftung
1994 Hermann Hesse Award (Förderpreis) for Feuerland
1995 Nicolas Born Prize of the Hubert Burda Stiftung
1996 Thaddäus-Troll-Preis
1996 Culture Prize "Der Feldweg" of the Museum Society Wald, Baden-Württemberg
1997 Mark Brandenburg Scholarship for literature (Märkisches Stipendium für Literatur)
1998 Marie Luise Kaschnitz Prize
1998/1999 Stadtschreiber von Bergen
1999 Alemannischer Literaturpreis
1999 Georg Büchner Prize
2002 Medal for Merit of the state of Baden-Württemberg
2002 Participating Max Kade writer at the Washington University in St. Louis
2004 Stefan Andres Prize
2004/2005 Scholarship holder of the International Künstlerhaus Villa Concordia in Bamberg
2006 Honoris causa of the Freien Universität Berlin (Faculty for historical and cultural sciences; Seminar for catholic theology; Laudatorin: Annette Schavan).
2009 Kleist Prize (destined by Péter Esterházy)
2010 Johann Peter Hebel Prize
2014 Bodensee-Literaturpreis

Stadler is member of the foundation board for the Peace Prize of the German Book Trade.

Works 

 Kein Herz und keine Seele. Man muss es singen können, Gedichte, Erker-Verlag, St. Gallen 1986
 Das Buch der Psalmen und die deutschsprachige Lyrik des 20. Jahrhunderts. Zu den Psalmen im Werk Bertolt Brechts und Paul Celans (= Dissertation zur Erlangung des Doktorgrades der Phil. Fak. der Univ. Köln, vorgelegt von A. Stadler 1986), Böhlau Verlag, Köln, Wien 1989
 Ich war einmal, Roman, Residenz, Salzburg 1989
 Feuerland, Roman, Residenz, Salzburg 1992
 Mein Hund, meine Sau, mein Leben, Roman, Residenz, Salzburg 1994
 Warum toben die Heiden und andere Psalmen, Residenz, Salzburg 1995
 Gedichte aufs Land, mit Offsetlithografien von Hildegard Pütz, Eremiten-Presse, Düsseldorf 1995
 Der Tod und ich, wir zwei, Residenz, Salzburg 1996
 Johann Peter Hebels Unvergänglichkeit, Mayer, Berlin/Stuttgart 1997
 Ausflug nach Afrika. Eine Wintergeschichte, Edition Isele, Eggingen 1997
 Volubilis oder Meine Reisen ans Ende der Welt, Erzählungen, Edition Isele, Eggingen 1999
 Ein hinreissender Schrotthändler, Roman, DuMont, Köln 1999, Taschenbuch Goldmann, München 2001
 Die Menschen lügen. Alle. Und andere Psalmen, Insel, Frankfurt a.M. 1999
 Erbarmen mit dem Seziermesser, Essays, DuMont, Köln 2000
 Tohuwabohu. Heiliges und Profanes, gelesen und wiedergelesen von Arnold Stadler nach dem 11. September 2001, Anthologie, DuMont, Köln, August 2002
 Sehnsucht. Versuch über das erste Mal, Roman, DuMont, Köln, August 2002
 Eines Tages, vielleicht auch nachts, Roman, Jung und Jung, 2003
 Mein Stifter. Porträt eines Selbstmörders in spe, DuMont, Köln 2005
 Komm, gehen wir. Roman, S. Fischer, Frankfurt a. M. 2007
 Salvatore, S. Fischer, Frankfurt a. M. 2008
 Träumen vom Fliegen, mit dem Fotokünstler Jan von Holleben, Hoffmann und Campe, Hamburg 2008
 Einmal auf der Welt. Und dann so. Roman (kompilierte, überarbeitete und erweiterte Fassung der Romane Ich war einmal, Feuerland und Mein Hund, meine Sau, mein Leben), S. Fischer, Frankfurt a. M. 2009
 New York machen wir das nächste Mal. Geschichten aus dem Zweistromland, S. Fischer, Frankfurt a. M. 2011
 Auf dem Weg nach Winterreute: Ein Ausflug in die Welt des Malers Jakob Bräckle, Jung und Jung, Salzburg, Wien 2012
 Da steht ein großes JA vor mir. Zu einer Arbeit von Margaret Marquardt. Jung und Jung, Salzburg 2013, .
 Bilder als Partituren des Lebens:  Ein Ausflug in die Welt des Malers Jakob Braeckle. Eine Vergegenwärtigung. Steiner, Stuttgart 2013, .
 Rauschzeit. S. Fischer, Frankfurt am Main 2016, .

Literature 
 Irene Armbruster: Büchner-Preisträger Arnold Stadler in New York. Kein Landei; in: "Aufbau" No. 8, New York, April 20, 2000; p. 7.
 Martin Walser: Über das Verbergen der Verzweiflung; in: "DER SPIEGEL" Nr. 29/1999, Hamburg, 19. Juli 1999; S. 161–162.
 Stuart Taberner: Contemporary German Fiction: Writing in the Berlin Republic. Cambridge University Press, 2007, 
 Gregory Alexander Knott: Arnold Stadler and the metaphysics of Heimat. Thesis (Ph. D.), Washington University, 2007.

External links 
 
 The Scrap Dealer (or An adorable junk dealer) (Ein hinreissender Schrotthändler) − Abstract
 Biography • The 7th International Literature Festival Berlin
 Arnold Stadler: Die Kirche sollte im Dorf bleiben. Wie hält man's mit der Religion im multikulturellen Europa?. – In: taz, 15.04.2006 
 Dem Schriftsteller Arnold Stadler zum Sechzigsten – In: FAZ, 09.04.2014 

1954 births
Living people
People from Meßkirch
20th-century German novelists
21st-century German novelists
Kleist Prize winners
Georg Büchner Prize winners
German male novelists
German male dramatists and playwrights
Recipients of the Order of Merit of Baden-Württemberg
20th-century German dramatists and playwrights
21st-century German dramatists and playwrights
20th-century German male writers
21st-century German male writers